Tickle Cove is a settlement in Newfoundland and Labrador, located north west of Catalina. The first postmaster was John Maloney. The population was 115 in 1951. The 2013 comedy The Grand Seduction was filmed in Tickle Cove, and its setting of Tickle Head is based on the settlement.

See also
List of communities in Newfoundland and Labrador

Populated coastal places in Canada
Populated places in Newfoundland and Labrador